Hallel College is a private nursery, primary, secondary (day and boarding) and sixth form college founded in 1994. Its campuses are located at Rumuogba, Port Harcourt, Nigeria (day campus) and Airport Road, Port Harcourt, Rivers State, Nigeria (boarding campus).

History 
In 2017, Hallel College was one of four schools to win the International School Award from the British Council Nigeria, the others being Redeemer's International Secondary School and Oxbridge College both in Lagos, and Start-rite Schools, Abuja.

See also 

 List of Schools in Port Harcourt

References

External links 
 Hallel College - Official Website

Schools in Port Harcourt
Secondary schools in Rivers State
Private schools in Rivers State
Cambridge schools in Nigeria
Christian schools in Nigeria
Educational institutions established in 1994
1994 establishments in Nigeria